Shahabi (literally "meteoric") is a Persian language surname. Notable people with the name include:

 Cyrus Shahabi (fl. 1989–2014), Iranian-American computer scientist
 Hossein Shahabi (born 1967), Iranian film director, screenwriter and film producer
 Katayoon Shahabi (born 1968), Iranian film producer
 Mohammad Shahabi (1922–1973), Ahwazi musician and dulcimer player
 Reza Shahabi (fl. 2010–2012), Iranian trade unionist
 Saeeid Shahabi (born 1954) Bahraini political activist and journalist
 Mustafa Shahabi (born 1893), Syrian agronomist, politician, writer, and director of the Arab Academy of Damascus

See also
 Shahabi (disambiguation)

References